Stolniceni may refer to places in Romania:

 Stolniceni, a village in Răuseni Commune, Botoșani County
 Stolniceni, a district in Râmnicu Vâlcea, Vâlcea County
 Stolniceni-Prăjescu, a commune in Iași County
 Stolniceni (river), a tributary of the Siret in Iași County

and places in Moldova:
 Stolniceni, Edineț, a commune in Edineț District
 Stolniceni, Hîncești, a commune in Hîncești District
 Stolniceni, a village in Cioropcani Commune, Ungheni District